Emil Peter Forsberg (born 23 October 1991) is a Swedish professional footballer who plays as an attacking midfielder for Bundesliga club RB Leipzig and the Sweden national team.

Forsberg was awarded Guldbollen in 2021 as Sweden's best footballer of the year. He has also been voted the Swedish Midfielder of the Year four times (2016, 2017, 2019 and 2021). He was a member of the Sweden squad that reached the quarter-finals of the 2018 FIFA World Cup, and also represented his country at UEFA Euro 2016 and 2020, the latter of which he scored four goals in four games. He is known for his quick, effective passing style, and is a creative playmaker renowned for his ability to create chances and assists.

Club career

GIF Sundsvall
Born in Sundsvall, Forsberg started his career with his home-town team and joined the first team squad in 2009 when the club was playing in Sweden's second tier of football, Superettan. He went on to play several matches for Sundsvall in his first season. For his second season at the club he had become a regular in the starting eleven at Sundsvall and played 30 out of 30 matches for the 2010 season. Forsberg had started to produce goals during his second season at the club but raised his performance for the 2011 season when he scored 11 goals in 27 matches as Sundsvall were promoted to Sweden's first tier of football, Allsvenskan. For his first season in Allsvenskan Forsberg played 21 matches out of 30 and scored 6 goals, however Sundsvall were relegated to Superettan once again after losing the relegation play-offs against Halmstads BK.

Malmö FF

On 10 December 2012, Forsberg was presented as a Malmö player. He joined the club on 1 January 2013 when the transfer window opened in Sweden. Forsberg signed a four-year contract lasting until the end of the 2016 season. His first season at the club proved to be a success as he played 28 matches out of 30 and scored five goals for the club as they won the league title. He also played all matches for the club during the qualification stage for the 2013–14 UEFA Europa League and scored two goals. During Malmö FF's successful 2014 season Forsberg made 29 league appearances, scoring 14 goals and thus being an important part in the team that defended the league title. He also participated in all of the club's matches in the 2014–15 UEFA Champions League campaign in which Malmö FF qualified for the group stage. As recognition of Forsberg's feats during the season he won the award for Allsvenskan Midfielder of the year. He was also nominated for Swedish midfielder of the year at Fotbollsgalan.

RB Leipzig
In January 2015, Forsberg joined German second league side RB Leipzig on a three and a half year deal. In February 2016, he extended his contract until 2021. During the 2015–16 season Forsberg was voted the best player in 2. Bundesliga and in January 2016 Liverpool were reportedly eyeing Forsberg. In round three of 2016–17 Bundesliga Forsberg was named player of the round by Kicker. At the end of the 2016–17 season, Forsberg finished off as the highest assister in the Bundesliga and top 5 leagues in Europe with 22 assists, and made the Bundesliga team of the season. On 13 September 2017, Forsberg scored RB Leipzig's first ever Champions League goal in their first match ever in a 1–1 draw against Monaco.

In the 2019–20 season, he scored a brace in the stoppage time in a 2–2 draw against Benfica, to secure a place for RB Leipzig in the 2019–20 UEFA Champions League knockout phase, where they managed to reach the semi-finals. On 4 November 2020, Forsberg scored a goal in a 2–1 win over Paris Saint-Germain in the 2020–21 UEFA Champions League.

International career

Early career 
Having previously played for the Swedish under-19 team, Emil Forsberg made his senior international debut for the Swedish national team in a 2–1 friendly win over Moldova on 17 January 2014.

UEFA Euro 2016 
He made his competitive debut in a UEFA Euro 2016 qualifier against Liechtenstein on 12 October 2014. He scored his first international goal for Sweden in the UEFA Euro 2016 qualifying play-offs against Denmark, helping Sweden beat the Danes 4–3 on aggregate and qualify for Euro 2016. Forsberg played in all three games for Sweden at Euro 2016 as Sweden was eliminated in the group stage.

2018 FIFA World Cup 
In May 2018, he was named in Sweden's 23 man squad for the 2018 FIFA World Cup in Russia. On 3 July 2018 in a round of 16 tie between Sweden and Switzerland Forsberg scored the winner for Sweden to send them into the quarter finals of the World Cup for the first time in almost a quarter of a century.

UEFA Euro 2020 
Forsberg was included in Sweden's 26-man squad for UEFA Euro 2020. Forsberg scored four goals in the tournament, and hit both the crossbar and the post in the Round of 16 game against Ukraine when Sweden lost 2–1 after extra-time, for his performances, he received praise as one of the best players in the tournament. He is the only Swedish player to have scored four goals in a UEFA European Championship, beating Tomas Brolin's (in 1992) and Henrik Larsson's (in 2004) previous record of three goals.

Personal life
Emil Forsberg is the son of former GIF Sundsvall player Leif Forsberg, and grandson of Lennart Forsberg who also played for GIF Sundsvall. On 17 July 2016, Forsberg married Shanga Hussain, who is a former footballer. The couple live in Leipzig, having first met in Sundsvall. They own a dog, Roffe, who is a Golden Retriever. They had their first child in August 2018.

Forsberg has named Dutch winger Ryan Babel as a player he has looked up to.

Career statistics

Club

International

Scores and results list Sweden's goal tally first.

Honours

Malmö FF
 Allsvenskan: 2013, 2014
 Svenska Supercupen: 2013, 2014

RB Leipzig
 DFB-Pokal: 2021–22

Individual
 Allsvenskan Midfielder of the Year: 2014
 Swedish Midfielder of the Year: 2016, 2017, 2019, 2021
 Bundesliga assist leader: 2016–17
 Bundesliga Team of the Season: 2016–17
Guldbollen: 2021

References

External links

Malmö FF profile 
 (archive)
 (archive)

1991 births
Living people
People from Sundsvall
Swedish footballers
Association football midfielders
Association football wingers
GIF Sundsvall players
Malmö FF players
RB Leipzig players
Division 3 (Swedish football) players
Superettan players
Allsvenskan players
2. Bundesliga players
Bundesliga players
Sweden youth international footballers
Sweden international footballers
UEFA Euro 2016 players
2018 FIFA World Cup players
UEFA Euro 2020 players
Swedish expatriate footballers
Swedish expatriate sportspeople in Germany
Expatriate footballers in Germany
Sportspeople from Västernorrland County